The National Institute of Public Cooperation and Child Development (NIPCCD) is an Indian government agency in New Delhi under the Ministry of Women and Children Development tasked with promotion of voluntary action research, training and documentation in the overall domain of women empowerment and child development in India. Established in 1966, the Institute has four Regional Centres, Guwahati (1978), Bangalore (1980), Lucknow (1982), and Indore (2001). In April 1985, the Institute received the Maurice Pate Memorial Award from UNICEF in honor of "its work in developing services for children, training, research and advocacy".

See also
Women in India
Integrated Child Development Services (ICDS)

References

External links
Website: Ministry of Women and Child Development, GOI
Website: National Institute of Public Cooperation and Child Development, New Delhi

Government agencies of India